The Erbil Civilization Museum is an archeological museum which is located within the city of Hawler, the capital of Iraqi Kurdistan. It is the second largest museum in Iraqi Kurdistan, after the Sulaymaniyah Museum in Sulaymaniyah Governorate in terms of contents and collections. It houses artifacts which date back to the pre-historic period to the late Abbasid period.

History
The very first building of the Museum was established in mid-1960 and contained few artifacts. The building was small and was located within the heart of the city of Hawler, at the Minarah district. The, then, Erbil Archaeological Inspection Directorate was responsible for administering the museum. In the mid-1970s, the museum building was relocated into the Citadel of Erbil. The museum was administered by the General Directorate of Archaeology in Baghdad. After then, many artifacts, from different ancient periods were transferred from the Iraqi Museum in Baghdad to the museum as a permanent loan. The content and collections of the museum grew tremendously. 
Another project to establish a new building was started in 1985 to accommodate the increasing number of artifacts. The current building was opened in 1989, after the end of the Iraq-Iran war (1980-1988) and lies close to the ancient tell of Qalinj Agha.
After the invasion of Kuwait (by the Iraqi Army) in 1990, the Kurdish uprising in 1991, and the internal Kurdish civil war in the mid-1990s, many museum's archives were lost. Therefore, information about many of the museum's acquisitions and artifacts are not available.

Halls
The museum's building is relatively small and is divided into 3 displaying halls:
 The first hall houses artifacts from the pre-historic periods to the beginning of the 2nd Millennium BC. Visitors will see artifacts from the Paleolithic age, Jarmo, Halaf, Samara, Ubaid, Uruk, Eridu, Early Dynastic, Akkadian, and Neo-Sumerian periods. Few items date back to the Old-Babylonian period.
 The second hall displays items from the Urartian, Hurrian, Assyrian (both Middle and Neo-Assyrian), Seleucid, and Hatra periods. There are no artifacts from the Neo-Babylonian period. 
 The last hall contains artifacts from the Sassanid and Islamic periods (mostly Abbasid).

Opening Hours
The museum is open from Monday to Thursday, 9;00 AM to 1:00 PM. It is closed on holidays. The entrance is free.

Gallery

References

 http://bot.gov.krd/erbil-province-erbil/arts-and-cultures-history-and-heritage/erbil-civilization-museum
 http://etc.ancient.eu/photos/visiting-erbil-civilization-museum-iraqi-kurdistan/
 https://iraqiinstitute.wordpress.com/2011/10/06/erbil-civilization-museum/

Museums in Erbil
Archaeological museums in Iraq